Actinotalea is a genus in the phylum Actinomycetota (bacteria).

Etymology
The name Actinotalea derives from:
 Greek noun , a beam =actinomycete-like bacterium; Latin feminine gender noun , a slender staff, rod, stick; New Latin feminine gender noun Actinotalea, ray stick, in effect meaning a slender bacillus-shaped actinomycete-like bacterium.
The specific epithet  fermentans is from the Latin participle adjective fermentans, fermenting.

See also

References

bacteria genera
Micrococcales